The North Fork Clackamas River is a tributary, about  long, of the Clackamas River in the U.S. state of Oregon. From source to mouth, the following tributaries enter the river: Dry Creek from the right bank, Boyer Creek from the left bank, then Whiskey, Bedford, Bee, and Fall creeks, all from the right.

Prominent landforms include Ladee Flats, a flat-topped ridge composed of lava flows resistant to erosion. The North Fork valley is narrow and steep, and a  waterfall  from the mouth limits passage of migratory fish. Native rainbow and cutthroat trout are found in the upper river and its tributaries, while the lower river has winter and summer steelhead, coho salmon, spring chinook, and stocked rainbow trout.

See also
List of rivers of Oregon

References

Works cited
 North Fork Clackamas River Watershed Analysis: Final Report (1996). United States Department of Agriculture, U.S. Forest Service, and the Bureau of Land Management. Retrieved on March 19, 2009.

External links
Clackamas River Basin Council 

Rivers of Oregon
Rivers of Clackamas County, Oregon